Daryl Cumber Dance (born January 17, 1938) is an American academic best known for her work on black folklore.

Biography
Daryl Veronica Cumber was born in Richmond, Virginia, to Allen and Veronica Bell Cumber. She attended Ruthville High School in Ruthville, Virginia, and earned a bachelor's degree in English from Virginia State College in 1957. She then taught at Armstrong High School in Richmond until 1962, when she returned to Virginia State College as an instructor. The next year, she completed a master's degree from Virginia State. In 1971, she graduated from the University of Virginia with a doctorate in English, and was named an assistant professor at Virginia State. She taught at Virginia Commonwealth University between 1972 and 1993, when she joined the University of Richmond faculty. In 2013, she was appointed Sterling A. Brown Professor of English at Howard University.

Dance has served as advisory editor of the Black American Literary Forum and editorial advisor of the Journal of West Indian Literature.

Works
Shuckin' and Jivin': Folklore from Contemporary Black Americans (1978)
Folklore from Contemporary Jamaicans (1985)
Fifty Caribbean Writers: A Bio-Bibliographical Critical Sourcebook (1986)
Long Gone: The Mecklenburg Six and the Theme of Escape in Black Folklore (1987)
New World Adams: Conversations With Contemporary West Indian Writers (1992)
Honey, Hush!: An Anthology of African American Women's Humor (1998)
From My People: 400 Years of African American Folklore (2002)
In Search of Annie Drew: Jamaica Kincaid's Mother and Muse (2016)

References

1938 births
Living people
American women academics
African-American academics
People from Richmond, Virginia
Virginia State University alumni
University of Virginia alumni
Howard University faculty
University of Richmond faculty
Virginia State University faculty
Black studies scholars
21st-century African-American people
21st-century African-American women
20th-century African-American people
20th-century African-American women